Regina Egle Catrambone is an Italian philanthropist, co-founder of Migrant Offshore Aid Station, a non-governmental organisation specialising in search and rescue at sea. It has been predominantly active in the Mediterranean sea as part of the European refugee crisis, where it has rescued tens of thousands of migrants.

Personal life and career

Catrambone was born in Reggio Calabria, Italy, and was living there when she met her future husband, the American entrepreneur Christopher Catrambone, in 2006. The two were married in 2010, and live in Malta with their teenage daughter, Maria Luisa. Catrambone and her husband worked together to build the insurance firm Tangiers Group, which specialises in insuring people working in conflict areas.

Migrant aid work

While on a yacht cruise near Lampedusa in July 2013, the Catrambones encountered a floating jacket which had been abandoned by a migrant, and began to realise the scale of the unfolding humanitarian crisis. This was followed by a statement from Pope Francis urging business entrepreneurs to provide more assistance, and together this spurred them to form Migrant Offshore Aid Station (MOAS), a privately-run search and rescue operation working to save lives among migrants trying to cross to Europe. The two bought a trawler, MV Phoenix, under the auspices of Tangiers Group, and invested a further $2.3 million US dollars of their own money before beginning operations in August 2014. By the end of that year, they estimated they had rescued some 3,000 people. In 2015, they began operating additional vessels, and expanded operations into the Aegean Sea. By the end of that year, MOAS had rescued more than 12,000 people.

Catrambone runs the humanitarian side of the organisation, with her husband focusing more on operations. She has enlisted a range of supporters, including the Archbishop of Malta.

References

Further reading
 

1975 births
Living people
People from Calabria
People from Reggio Calabria
Italian philanthropists
Italian humanitarians
Women philanthropists
Women humanitarians